Greg Mortenson is an American professional speaker, writer, veteran, and former mountaineer. He is a co-founder and former executive director of the non-profit Central Asia Institute and the founder of the educational charity Pennies for Peace.

Mortenson is the co-author of The New York Times Bestseller Three Cups of Tea and Stones into Schools: Promoting Peace with Books, Not Bombs, in Afghanistan and Pakistan.

Mortenson was accused of financial irregularities in handling donations to the CAI and falsehoods in his books. In 2012, Mortenson repaid $1 million to the CAI after an inquiry by the Montana Attorney General.

Early life
Mortenson was born in St. Cloud, Minnesota. His parents, Irvin and Jerene, went with the Lutheran Church to Tanganyika (now Tanzania) in 1958 to be teachers at a girls' school in the Usambara mountains. In 1961, Irvin became a fundraiser and development director for the Kilimanjaro Christian Medical Center, the first teaching hospital in Tanzania. Jerene was the founding principal of International School Moshi. Spending his early childhood and adolescence in Tanzania, Mortenson learned to speak fluent Swahili.

In the early 1970s, when he was 15 years old, Mortenson and his family left Tanzania and moved back to Minnesota. From 1973 to 1975, he attended Ramsey High School in Roseville, Minnesota, from which he graduated.

After high school, Mortenson served in the U.S. Army in Germany from 1975 to 1977 and was awarded the Army Commendation Medal. Following his discharge, he attended Concordia College in Moorhead, Minnesota, from 1977 to 1979 on an athletic (football) scholarship.

In 1978, Concordia College's football team won the NAIA Division III national championship with a 7-0 win over Findlay, Ohio. Mortenson graduated from the University of South Dakota in 1983 with a bachelor's degree in liberal studies and an associate degree in nursing.

Humanitarian work and career

Origins in K2

Mortenson describes the origins of his humanitarian work in his best-selling book Three Cups of Tea. He states he traveled to northern Pakistan in 1993 to climb the world's second-highest mountain, K2, as a memorial to his sister, Christa. After more than 70 days on the mountain, located in the Karakoram range, Mortenson failed to reach the summit. Earlier, Mortenson and fellow climber Scott Darsney were also involved in a 75-hour life-saving rescue of another climber, Etienne Fine, which put them in a weakened state. After the rescue, he descended the mountain and set out with a local Balti porter, Mouzafer Ali, to the nearest city.

According to the account in Three Cups of Tea, Mortenson stated he took a wrong turn on the trail and ended up in the small village of Korphe. Physically exhausted, ill, and alone at the time of his arrival there, Mortenson was cared for by some of Korphe's residents while he recovered. As a gesture of gratitude to the community for their assistance to him, Mortenson said he would build a school for the village after he noticed local students attending school in an outdoor location and writing out their lessons in the dirt.

Mortenson has since admitted in a 2011 interview that the timing in the Korphe account in Three Cups of Tea is inaccurate, and that the events actually took place long after his descent from K2, over a longer period of time and during separate trips.

Literacy in Central Asia

Mortenson has written and spoken widely about the importance of education and literacy for girls worldwide. He has further stated that girls' education is the most important investment all countries can make to create stability, bring socio-economic reform, decrease infant mortality and population explosion, and improve health, hygiene, and sanitation standards. The lawsuit was dismissed with prejudice in federal court in May 2012. U.S. District Judge Sam Haddon chided the plaintiffs for presenting arguments that he called imprecise, flimsy, and speculative. An appeals suit was dropped by the 9th District Federal Circuit Court on October 10, 2013.

On October 6, 2013, after a lengthy lawsuit filed by Central Asia Institute, Philadelphia Insurance Company was ordered by Magistrate Judge Jeremy Lynch to repay Central Asia Institute $1.2 million to pay for legal costs involved in the lawsuits and investigations.

In May 2015, the Montana Attorney General stated that Central Asia Institute and Mortenson had completed the terms of a three-year compliance monitoring period, and CAI stated that the IRS had completed its examination of the nonprofit. The organization reported that it was having a return of donors and rise in contributions.

3000 Cups of Tea
Jennifer Jordan and Jeff Rhoads refuted the claims against Mortenson in their 2016 documentary 3000 Cups of Tea. In the film and through interviews Jordan argued that the accusations against Mortenson put forward by 60 Minutes and Jon Krakauer were largely not true and that both failed to do adequate research and source verification.

Jordan said in 2014: "Yes, Greg is a bad manager and accountant, and he is the first to admit that, but he is also a tireless humanitarian with a crucially important mission."

Recognition

Awards
 2003 Al Neuharth Free Spirit of the Year Award for building schools for Pakistani girls.
 2008 Citizen Center for Diplomacy National Award for Citizen Diplomacy
 2008 Courage of Conscience Award
 2008 Graven Award – Wartburg College, IA
 2008 Mary Lockwood Founders Medal For Education – Daughters of The American Revolution
 2008 Sword of Loyola, St. Louis University, MO
 2008 Charles Eliot Educator Award – New England Association of Schools & Colleges
 2009 Academy of Achievement Award
 2009 Sitara-e-Pakistan (The Star of Pakistan medal)
 2009 Archon Award – Sigma Theta Tau International (Nursing Award)
 2009 Austin College Leadership Award, Sherman TX – life work to take courageous stand on education issues for peace
 2009 National Education Association (NEA) Human & Civil Rights Award
 2009 City College San Francisco Amicus Collegii Award – Promoting peace through education
 2009 S. Roger Horchow Award for Greatest Public Service by a Private Citizen (Jefferson Award), Carnegie Endowment & Harvard Kennedy School of Government
 2009 U.S. News & World Report: America's Top 20 Best Leaders 2009
 2009 Italy: Premio Gambrinus "Giuseppe Mazzotti"
 2010 Loyola Marymount University (CA) – Doshi Bridgebuilder Of Peace Award
 2010 The Common Wealth Awards: For Public Service
 2010 The Salem Award for Human Rights – Salem News
 2010 The Christopher Award: "To affirm the highest values of the human spirit"
 2010 The 10th annual Lantern Award "Excellence in Education Innovation" (MOSTE – LA, CA)
 2010 Distinguished Service To Education Award: National Elementary School Principals Association
 2010 Creativity Foundation & Smithsonian Institution: Benjamin Franklin Laureate Award For Public Service
 2010 Literature To Life Award – American Place Theater
 2010 Viking Award – Norway House for pursuit of hard, bold, dangerous and important undertakings
 2010 Freedom Award – America's Freedom Festival at Provo, for extraordinary devotion to the cause of liberty at home and abroad
 2010 American Peace Award – representing the spirit of world peace through thoughts and actions
 2010 The Mason Award – Extraordinary contribution in literature (George Mason University DC)
 2011 Gelett Burgess Children's Book Award Three Cups of Tea Young Reader's Edition
 2011 Presidential Award for Leadership in Social Change – Walden University
 2011 Raoul Wallenberg Award for humanitarian endeavors – Old Dominion Univ., VA

Honorary degrees
 Frostburg State University, Frostburg, MD 2006
 Concordia College, Moorhead, MN 2007
 Montana State University, MT 2008 
 Villanova University, PA 2008 
 University  of San Francisco, CA 2008 
 University of Washington – Bothell, WA 2008 
 Lewis & Clark College, OR 2008 
 Colby College, ME 2009 
 Simmons College, MA 2009 
 Saint Louis University, MO 2009 
 Loyola University Chicago, IL 2009 
 University of Pennsylvania, PA 2010 
 Brookdale College, Lincroft, NJ 2010 
 University of Colorado, Colorado Springs 2010 
 Stevenson University (MD) 2010 
 Wittenberg University (OH) 2010

Published works

Personal life
Mortenson lives in Bozeman, Montana, with his wife, Tara Bishop, a clinical psychologist, and their two children, Amira and Khyber. In 2011, Mortenson was diagnosed with hypoxia and had surgery for an aneurysm and an atrial septal defect, an event which exactly coincided with the airing of the 60 Minutes expose and the release of Krakauer's accompanying book.

References

External links
Official website of Greg Mortenson
Official website of "Pennies For Peace"

"The Real Enemy is Ignorance," Greg Mortenson's Ubben Lecture at DePauw University, November 13, 2008.

Living people
American memoirists
American humanitarians
American philanthropists
American Protestants
American mountain climbers
Founders of educational institutions
Education in Afghanistan
Education in Pakistan
Literacy advocates
University of South Dakota alumni
Writers from Bozeman, Montana
People from St. Cloud, Minnesota
People from Roseville, Minnesota
American expatriates in Pakistan
Male nurses
Recipients of the Sitara-e-Pakistan
Year of birth missing (living people)